Heelaiy is a 1997 Maldivian crime thriller film directed by Ahmed Mohamed Didi. Produced by Aslam Rasheed under Slam Studio, the film stars Reeko Moosa Manik and Aishath Shiranee in lead roles. It is an unofficial remake of Abbas–Mustan's Bollywood film Baazigar (1993) starring Shah Rukh Khan, Kajol and Dalip Tahil in the pivotal roles which was loosely based on Ira Levin's 1953 novel A Kiss Before Dying and its 1991 film adaptation of the same name.

Premise
Shah Naseer (Reeko Moosa Manik) is an intellectual young man determined to avenge his father's death caused by Afeef (Mohamed Waheed), a wealthy businessman. Shah begins a romantic relationship with Afeef's eldest daughter, Aishath Naazleen (Aishath Shiranee). She decides to marry him on the sly since she is terrified of her father's anger. Soon after, she is mysteriously murdered by Shah and her death becomes ruled as a suicide. Shah meets Naazleen's twin sister, Naazneen (Aishath Shiranee) who disregards police report of her sister's suicide and tries on her own to trace the murderer. It is later discovered that Naazleen's friend, Jameela and her secret lover, Amir, own up to Naazleen's death and commit suicide. Convinced that her sister's murderer is no more, Naazneen moves ahead with her life with Shah only to find out that Naazleen's killer is alive.

Cast 
 Reeko Moosa Manik as Shah Naseer
 Aishath Shiranee as Aishath Naazleen / Naazneen
 Mohamed Waheed
 Dhon Annaaru Rasheed
 Chilhiya Moosa Manik as Thuhthu Seedhi
 Mohamed Riyaz
 Arifa Ibrahim as Hawwa Mohamed
 Ali Shameel as Adhil
 Ibrahim Wisan as young Shah Naseer
 Fauziyya Ahmed
 Ibrahim Waheed as police inspector
 Samandhar Iburey
 Adam Naseer
 Abdul Rahman
 Ismail Wajeeh as TV anchor (special appearance)

Soundtrack

Response
Upon release, the film received positive response from the critics and audience. In an article published by Ahmed Adhushan of Mihaaru, he wrote: "an exact replica of its original, the film tried to incorporate almost all the elements of Baazigar except the fact that Shirani played the dual roles performed by Kajol and Shilpa Shetty.

Accolades

References

Maldivian thriller films
1997 films
Remakes of Maldivian films